Storm Emma, also called Ulrike, was a deep depression which was part of the 2017–18 European windstorm season. The worst affected areas were southwest England and southern Wales.

Snowfall, and temperatures

Snowfall
Snowfall was reported along the coast of Italy and French Riviera for the first time since 2010 and UK since 29 September 2017. Snow also fell in Barcelona, a rare occurrence for the region, disrupting Formula One car testing ahead of the 2018 season.

Temperatures

Effects

Holyhead Marina in Holyhead, North Wales was destroyed due to the storm on March 1–2, 2018.

See also 
 Other storms named Emma
 Storm Larisa, which brought heavy snowfall to the United Kingdom in March 2023

References 

Weather events in the United Kingdom
European windstorms
Blizzards
February 2018 events in the United Kingdom
March 2018 events in the United Kingdom